The following page lists the tallest buildings and structures in Sri Lanka in terms of the highest architectural detail. Whereas structures that are under construction but have topped out are included in this list.

The majority of high-rise structures in the country are located in the commercial capital Colombo.

Tallest structures
This list ranks the structures in Sri Lanka that stand at least 100 m (330 ft) or 20 floors. Only completed buildings and structures are included.

Tallest structure by category

The following table is a list of the tallest completed or topped out structures in each of the categories below. There can only be one structure in each category unless the title for the tallest is a draw.

Structures under construction

This list ranks buildings and structures that are under construction in Sri Lanka and are planned to rise at least 100m (330 ft) or 20 floors tall. Colombo has the most under-construction buildings and structures followed by Kotte.

On hold
This table lists buildings that were at one time under construction in Sri Lanka and were expected to rise at least 100 metres (330 ft) or 20 floors in height, but are now on hold. While not officially cancelled, construction has been suspended on each development.

Proposed/Vision

This list ranks buildings and structures that are approved or proposed and are planned to rise at least 100 m (330 ft) or 20 floors tall.

Timeline of tallest structures

Timeline of tallest buildings

See also
 List of tallest buildings and structures in South Asia
 List of tallest buildings in Asia
 List of tallest buildings in the world
errorBold text''''''n

References

External links

 
Tallest buildings and structures
Sri Lanka
Sri Lanka